Ben Stillman is an American film producer. Stillman assisted in the development of the Oscar-winning film The Imitation Game in 2014. He has produced four films including Broken City, which premiered at Sundance Film Festival, and Gold (2016) starring Matthew McConaughey in 2016. Stillman is vice president of Black Bear Pictures.

Career 
In 2011, Black Bear Pictures was established and Stillman joined the company as creative executive after leaving Cinetic International. Stillman was associate producer of At Any Price in 2012. He was named vice president of Black Bear Pictures in 2013. He co-produced A.C.O.D. starring Adam Scott, as well as Broken City, starring Mark Wahlberg and Russell Crowe, in 2013. He was executive producer of Gold, a drama-thriller film about the search for gold in the jungles of Indonesia that was scheduled to be released in 2016.

Filmography 
He was producer for all films unless otherwise noted.

Film 

Miscellaneous crew

References

External links 
 

American film producers
Living people
Year of birth missing (living people)